The promontory of the tympanic cavity, also known as the cochlear promontory is a rounded hollow prominence, formed by the projection outward of the first turn of the cochlea.

It is placed between the oval window and the round window, and is furrowed on its surface by small grooves, for the lodgement of branches of the tympanic plexus.

A minute spicule of bone frequently connects the promontory to the pyramidal eminence.

Additional images

References

External links
 

Ear